In numerical analysis, the Newton–Cotes formulas, also called the Newton–Cotes quadrature rules or simply Newton–Cotes rules, are a group of formulas  for numerical integration (also called quadrature) based on evaluating the integrand at  equally spaced points. They are named after Isaac Newton and Roger Cotes.

Newton–Cotes formulas can be useful if the value of the integrand at equally spaced points is given. If it is possible to change the points at which the integrand is evaluated, then other methods such as Gaussian quadrature and Clenshaw–Curtis quadrature are probably more suitable.

Description 
Newton–Cotes formulas using  points can be defined (for both classes) as

where

The number  is called step size,  are called weights.

The weights can be computed as the integral of Lagrange basis polynomials.

Let  be the interpolation polynomial in the Lagrange form for the given data points , then

Instability for high degree 
A Newton–Cotes formula of any degree  can be constructed. However, for large  a Newton–Cotes rule can sometimes suffer from catastrophic Runge's phenomenon where the error grows exponentially for large . Methods such as Gaussian quadrature and Clenshaw–Curtis quadrature with unequally spaced points (clustered at the endpoints of the integration interval) are stable and much more accurate, and are normally preferred to Newton–Cotes. If these methods cannot be used, because the integrand is only given at the fixed equidistributed grid, then Runge's phenomenon can be avoided by using a composite rule, as explained below.

Alternatively, stable Newton–Cotes formulas can be constructed using least-squares approximation instead of interpolation. This allows building numerically stable formulas even for high degrees.

Closed Newton–Cotes formulas 
This table lists some of the Newton–Cotes formulas of the closed type.

Boole's rule is sometimes mistakenly called Bode's rule, as a result of the propagation of a typographical error in Abramowitz and Stegun, an early reference book.

The exponent of the step size h in the error term gives the rate at which the approximation error decreases. The order of the derivative of f in the error term gives the lowest degree of a polynomial which can no longer be integrated exactly (i.e. with error equal to zero) with this rule. The number  must be taken from the interval , therefore, the error bound is equal to the error term when .

Open Newton–Cotes formulas 
This table lists some of the Newton–Cotes formulas of the open type.

Composite rules 
For the Newton–Cotes rules to be accurate, the step size  needs to be small, which means that the interval of integration  must be small itself, which is not true most of the time. For this reason, one usually performs numerical integration by splitting  into smaller subintervals, applying a Newton–Cotes rule on each subinterval, and adding up the results. This is called a composite rule. See Numerical integration.

See also 
 Quadrature (mathematics)
 Interpolation
 Spline interpolation

References 

 M. Abramowitz and I. A. Stegun, eds. Handbook of Mathematical Functions with Formulas, Graphs, and Mathematical Tables. New York: Dover, 1972. (See Section 25.4.)
 George E. Forsythe, Michael A. Malcolm, and Cleve B. Moler. Computer Methods for Mathematical Computations. Englewood Cliffs, NJ: Prentice–Hall, 1977. (See Section 5.1.)
 
 Josef Stoer and Roland Bulirsch. Introduction to Numerical Analysis. New York: Springer-Verlag, 1980. (See Section 3.1.)

External links 
 
 Newton–Cotes formulas on www.math-linux.com
 
 Newton–Cotes Integration, numericalmathematics.com

Numerical integration (quadrature)